The women's 200 metre breaststroke event, included in the swimming competition at the 1948 Summer Olympics, took place from 30 July to 3 August at the Empire Pool. In this event, swimmers covered four lengths of the 50-metre (160 ft) Olympic-sized pool employing the breaststroke. It was the fifth appearance of the event, which first appeared at the 1924 Summer Olympics in Paris. It was also the first appearance of the event since the outbreak of World War II. A total of 22 competitors from 14 nations participated in the event.

Records 
Prior to this competition, the existing world and Olympic records were:

The following records were established during the competition:

Hungarian Éva Székely set her Olympic record in the event using the butterfly stroke, which was allowed at the time. At the 1956 Summer Olympics, a new 100m butterfly event was created. The technique was disallowed in the 200m breaststroke event that year and in all future Olympic Games.

Results

Heats
The four fastest swimmers in each heat and the next four fastest swimmers overall advanced to the semifinals on 31 July.

Heat 1

Heat 2

Heat 3

Semifinals
The three fastest swimmers in each heat and the next two fastest overall  advanced to the final on 3 August.

Semifinal 1

Semifinal 2

Final

Sources

References

Women's breaststroke 200 metre
1948 in women's swimming
Women's events at the 1948 Summer Olympics